Pont Croesor is a railway halt in Wales, on the Welsh Highland Railway, which runs through the Snowdonia National Park from Caernarfon to Porthmadog.

Originally, as part of the Croesor Tramway, there was a siding at this location but no station. When the WHR was initially built in 1923 a small halt was provided; however, this closed with the railway in 1936 and all trace of this was removed when the line was lifted.

The line from Pont Croesor to  has been connected since early 2009, being available for stock transfer purposes. The station was officially opened on 26 May 2010 and was the WHR's temporary terminus, having previously opened to passengers on 22 May 2010.
 
It opened to timetabled passenger services on 8 January 2011.

When the station opened there was a full-length platform on the west side of the loop only, but with the commencement of through services in both directions during 2011 a second platform was provided. The station site is adjacent to Pont Croesor bridge, which crosses the River Glaslyn, and is a hybrid road/rail bridge, as each uses the same piers. The bridge was extensively modified in appearance recently to feature standard safety barriers. The new loop was finally completed, for operational purposes, on 13 March 2010.

During the 2010 and 2011 seasons the station has featured a staffed booking office and gift shop; however with all trains terminating at Porthmadog for the 2012 season Pont Croesor is no longer a terminus, and has therefore been downgraded to an unstaffed halt. The station building has been removed to Blaenau Ffestiniog but the waiting room remains.

Ospreys 
The station is adjacent to the viewing site of the  Glaslyn Osprey Project, from where the public can see the nesting place of a pair of ospreys. Chicks have been successfully raised every year since 2005. The majority of the WHR's construction in this area has been carried out whilst the birds are abroad in the winter months, in order to keep disturbance to a minimum.

See also 
 Ospreys in Britain

References 

Heritage railway stations in Gwynedd
Welsh Highland Railway
Dolbenmaen
Railway stations in Great Britain opened in 1923
Railway stations in Great Britain closed in 1936
Railway stations in Great Britain opened in 2010
Railway stations built for UK heritage railways